The 1951 NBA All-Star Game was an exhibition basketball game played on March 2, 1951, at Boston Garden in Boston, home of the Boston Celtics. The game was the first edition of the National Basketball Association (NBA) All-Star Game and was played during the 1950–51 NBA season. The idea of holding an All-Star Game was conceived during a meeting between NBA President Maurice Podoloff, NBA publicity director Haskell Cohen and Boston Celtics owner Walter A. Brown. At that time, the basketball world had just been stunned by the college basketball point-shaving scandal. In order to regain public attention to the league, Cohen suggested the league to host an exhibition game featuring the league's best players, similar to the Major League Baseball's All-Star Game. Although most people, including Podoloff, were pessimistic about the idea, Brown remained confident that it would be a success. He even offered to host the game and to cover all the expenses or potential losses incurred from the game. The Eastern All-Stars team defeated the Western All-Stars team 111–94. Boston Celtics' Ed Macauley was named as the first NBA All-Star Game Most Valuable Player Award. The game became a success, drawing an attendance of 10,094, much higher than that season's average attendance of 3,500.

Roster

The players for the All-Star Game were chosen by sports writers in several cities. They were not allowed to select players from their own cities. Players were selected without regard to position. On February 13, the team was announced by the NBA President Maurice Podoloff. Ten players from each Division were selected to represent the Eastern and Western Division in the All-Star Game. Vince Boryla, Ed Macauley, Dick McGuire and Dolph Schayes were unanimous selections to the Eastern team. Frank Brian, Ralph Beard, Bob Davies, Alex Groza, George Mikan, Vern Mikkelsen and Fred Schaus were unanimous selections to the Western team. Both the Philadelphia Warriors and the New York Knickerbockers were represented by three players each on the roster. The All-Star rosters included three rookies who were drafted in the 1950 draft: Paul Arizin, Bob Cousy and Larry Foust. Two players, Ken Murray and Arnie Risen, were named as alternates for the Eastern and Western team respectively. The alternates would be invited to the team if any of the twenty players selected failed to take part in the game. The starters were chosen by each team's head coach.

The coaches for the All-Star Game were the head coaches who coached the teams with the best winning percentage in their division through February 18, the Sunday two weeks before the All-Star game. The coach for the Western team was Minneapolis Lakers head coach John Kundla. As of February 18, the Lakers had 36–18 record, the best winning percentage in the Western Division and in the league. The coach for the Eastern team was New York Knickerbockers head coach Joe Lapchick. As of February 18, the Knickerbockers had 31–21 record, the best winning percentage in the Eastern Division and the second-best winning percentage in the league.

Note

 Ken Murray was a member of Eastern Division's Baltimore Bullets when the team was announced. He was sold to Western Division's Fort Wayne Pistons on February 15.

Game

The East defeated the West by 17 points. The West trailed by the end of the first quarter, where they were outscored by 9 points. The East's lead increased to 11 points at halftime and again to 19 points at the end of the third quarter. Boston Celtics' Ed Macauley scored a game-high 20 points and successfully defended Minneapolis Lakers star George Mikan, limiting him to only 4 field goals and 12 points. Alex Groza of the Indianapolis Olympians scored a team-high 17 points for the West. Syracuse Nationals' Dolph Schayes scored 15 points and also recorded a game-high 14 rebounds for the East while reserve Dick McGuire added a game-high 10 assists. Two other players from the East, Joe Fulks and reserve Paul Arizin, scored at least 19 and 15 points respectively as their team had 46.2 field goal percentage. On the other hand, the West only managed to make 32.7 percent of its shots. Macauley was named as the first All-Star Game Most Valuable Player. However, he was honored two years later during the 1953 All-Star Game, when the league decided to designate an MVP for each year's game.

Box score

References
General

Specific

External links
NBA All-Star Game History
NBA.com: All-Star Game: Year-by-Year Results

1951
All-Star Game
NBA All-Star Game, 1951
NBA All-Star Game, 1951
NBA All-Star Game
NBA All-Star Game